Lake Monroe may refer to one of the following places in the United States:
Lake Monroe, Florida, unincorporated community
Lake Monroe (Florida) in Florida, a lake on the St. Johns River
Lake Monroe (Mississippi) in Monroe County, Mississippi
Monroe Lake in Monroe and Brown counties, Indiana